ADSEC was the Advance Section of the Communications Zone (COMZ), European Theater of Operations, United States Army (ETOUSA), and was formally activated at Bristol, England in February 1944. It is commonly referred to as simply "ADSEC". Upon its creation, ADSEC was attached to the U.S. First Army, but from the outset was one section (of ten) of the Communications Zone (Com-Z, ETO) logistics organization, and was the first Army logistical agency on the continent. The section moved forward with the Armies and provided close support.  ADSEC came into actual operation on 6 June 1944 with the invasion of Normandy, D-Day, and was operating on both U.S. beaches as soon as they were secure.

As such, ADSEC did not have a "base" of operations because this support organization was designed to be on the move continuously.  For example, major operations always had a designated "D" day or start date for operations.  ADSEC units were moved into operating areas on or several days after a particular "D" day.  They stayed until about D+40, at which time FECOMZ (Forward Echelon, Communications Zone) units would take over.  ADSEC units then moved forward to the next "D" location.

After the 6 June 1944 invasion ADSEC was detached from the U.S. First Army and took control of activities at the port of Cherbourg Harbour, with engineering activities that included the beaches and landing zones; taking over command of the areas left behind as the First Army moved forward.  Besides bringing in supplies for the advancing armies, ADSEC also rehabilitated railway rolling stock and provided transportation of POL (Petroleum, Oil and Lubricants) using rail and motor operations (see Red Ball Express).

ADSEC units included field hospitals that lay near the rear areas of the advancing Armies.  ADSEC also operated blood banks to store large quantities under refrigerated conditions for use at front line hospitals.  This system of location of storage depots was flexible, so that in advance of a major military operation blood would be stored where needed, close to front line, but when the engagement was over then blood would be transported back to hospitals and other bases, or wherever it was needed.

ADSEC also included Finance disbursement units.  These units were employed to compute payrolls, travel vouchers, etc. and prepare disbursements and collections of monies.

ADSEC coordinated disbursement of ordnance and munitions to keep the front lines supplied.

ADSEC officials were responsible for overseeing Red Ball Express transportation activities within the Com-Z Transportation Section.

ADSEC units had to anticipate the needs of the advancing armies and provide as close support as possible to the advancing armies as the situations demanded.  These units also provided heavy maintenance work for the advancing armies.

Military units and formations of the United States Army in World War II
Sustainment and support units and formations of the United States Army